Egypt competed at the 2000 Summer Olympics in Sydney, Australia. 89 competitors, 74 men and 15 women, took part in 64 events in 20 sports.

Archery

In Egypt's debut archery competition, the nation entered only one man.  He lost his first match.

Athletics

Men
Track and road events

Field events

Boxing

Cycling

Road Cycling

Equestrianism

Jumping

Fencing

Five fencers, three men and two women, represented Egypt in 2000.

Gymnastics

Men

Handball

Summary

The following players represented Egypt:

 Ahmed Belal
 Amro El-Geioushy
 Ashraf Mabrouk Awaad
 Ayman El-Alfy
 Hany El-Fakharany
 Hazem Awaad
 Saber Hussein
 Hussain Said
 Hussain Zaky
 Magdy Abou El-Magd
 Mohamed Bakir El-Nakib
 Gohar Al-Nil
 Sherif Moemen
 Marwan Ragab
 Mohamed Sharaf El-Din

Group play

Quarterfinal

5th-8th place classification match

7th place match

Judo

Men

Women

Modern pentathlon

Rhythmic gymnastics

Individual all-around

Rowing

Men

Shooting

Men

Women

Swimming

Men

Women

Synchronized swimming

Women's Duet
 Heba Abdel Gawad and Sara Abdel Gawad
 Technical Routine – 29.727

Table Tennis

Men

Women

Taekwondo

Volleyball

Indoor 

Summary

Men

Team Roster
Mohamed Mouselhy
Mahmoud Abdul El Aziz
Ashraf Abou El Hassan
Eslam Awad
Mohamed El Houseny
Hamdy El Safy
Ibrahim Fathy
Sayed Khalil
Ussama Komsan
Hany Mouselhy
Ibrahim Rashwan
Nehad Shehata

Group play

|}

|}

Weightlifting

Wrestling

Greco-Roman

Notes

Wallechinsky, David (2004). The Complete Book of the Summer Olympics (Athens 2004 Edition). Toronto, Canada. . 
International Olympic Committee (2001). The Results. Retrieved 12 November 2005.
Sydney Organising Committee for the Olympic Games (2001). Official Report of the XXVII Olympiad Volume 1: Preparing for the Games. Retrieved 20 November 2005.
Sydney Organising Committee for the Olympic Games (2001). Official Report of the XXVII Olympiad Volume 2: Celebrating the Games. Retrieved 20 November 2005.
Sydney Organising Committee for the Olympic Games (2001). The Results. Retrieved 20 November 2005.
International Olympic Committee Web Site

References

Nations at the 2000 Summer Olympics
2000 Summer Olympics
Olympics